Thiruvananthapuram Taluk is a Taluk (tehsil) in Thiruvananthapuram district in the Indian state of Kerala. It is the most populous taluk in the district and one of the most populous in Kerala. It is situated in the western part of the Thiruvananthapuram district.

Settlements
There are thirty-one villages and one Municipal Corporation in this taluk.

Villages

Andoorkonam, Attipra, Cheruvakkal, Iroopara (Ayiroopara), Kadakampally, Kadinamkulam, Kalliyoor, Kazhakoottam, Keezhthonnakkal, Kowdiar, Kudappanakunnu, Manacaud, Melthonnakkal, Kazhakkoottam-Menamkulam, Muttathara, Nemom, Pallippuram, Pangappara, Pattom, Peroorkada, Pettah, Sasthamangalam, Thirumala (not Tirumala Tirupathi), Thiruvallam, Thycaud, Uliyazhthura, Ulloor, Vanchiyoor, Vattiyoorkavu, Veiloor, Venganoor.

References

Geography of Thiruvananthapuram district
Taluks of Kerala